The black-faced warbler (Abroscopus schisticeps) is a species of bush warbler (family Cettiidae). It was formerly included in the "Old World warbler" assemblage.

It is found in Bhutan, China, India, Myanmar, Nepal, and Vietnam. Its natural habitats are subtropical or tropical moist lowland forest and subtropical or tropical moist montane forest.

Gallery

References

black-faced warbler
Birds of North India
Birds of Nepal
Birds of Eastern Himalaya
Birds of Central China
Birds of Yunnan
Birds of Myanmar
Birds of Vietnam
black-faced warbler
black-faced warbler
Taxonomy articles created by Polbot